Holophaea gentilicia is a moth of the subfamily Arctiinae. It was described by Schaus in 1911. It is found in Costa Rica.

References

 Natural History Museum Lepidoptera generic names catalog

Euchromiina
Moths described in 1911